Hukou is a railway station on the Taiwan Railways Administration West Coast line located in Hukou Township, Hsinchu County, Taiwan.

History
The station was opened on 30 October 1893 as Dahukou (大湖口驛). It was renamed to its current name on 1 October 1920. A new, elevated station and platforms was completed on 18 December 2012.

See also

 List of railway stations in Taiwan

References

Railway stations served by Taiwan Railways Administration
Railway stations in Hsinchu County
1893 establishments in Taiwan
Railway stations opened in 1893